is a Japanese actress, voice actress and singer from Tochigi. She is the lead actress for the classic dorama series Long Vacation, starring alongside Takuya Kimura. 
She has been married to Toshiaki Karasawa since 1995.

Filmography

Television
Asadora Jun-chan no ōenka (1988–89), Junko Ono
Christmas at the Age of 29 (1994), Yabuki Noriko
Furuhata Ninzaburō (1996), Hōyō Futaba
Long Vacation (1996), Minami Hayama
Leaders (2014), Haruko Aichi
Leaders 2 (2017), Haruko Aichi
Hello, Detective Hedgehog (2017), Kaoru Kaze
Natsuzora (2019), Ayami Kishikawa
Medical Examiner Asagao (2019)

Films
Tōi Umi kara Kita Coo (1993), Catherine "Cathy" Ono (voice)
Ghost Pub (1994), Satoko
The Golden Compass (2007), Mrs. Coulter (Japanese dub)
Ponyo (2008), Lisa (voice)
Haru ni Chiru (2023), Reiko Sanada

Awards

References

External links

 
  

1964 births
Living people
Ken-On artists
Musicians from Tochigi Prefecture
Asadora lead actors
Voice actresses from Tochigi Prefecture